William Swanton (c.1630 - 18 July 1681) was an MP in the Cavalier Parliament of England, elected to represent Salisbury on 14 February 1673.

References

External links 

Members of Parliament for Salisbury
English MPs 1661–1679
Year of birth uncertain
1630s births
1681 deaths
English lawyers